Cody High School can refer to:
Frank Cody High School in Detroit, Michigan
Cody High School in Cody, Wyoming